The Malaysian Tamil diaspora refers to the global diaspora of Malaysian Tamil origin. It can be said to be a subset of the larger Malaysian and Tamil diaspora. Most of them settled in Singapore, Australia and North America.

References

External links
 Ministry of Foreign Affairs, Malaysia - Malaysian Mission Overseas
 Overseas Malaysian Communities
 Malaysia Central: Malaysians Abroad: Business, Networking, Community & Friendship Clubs Overseas

Malaysian diaspora
Tamil diaspora
Tamil diaspora in Malaysia